Camilo Eifler (born February 13, 1998) is an American football linebacker for the Washington Commanders of the National Football League (NFL). He played college football at Washington and Illinois before signing with the New York Jets as an undrafted free agent in 2021. Eifler has also been a member of the Miami Dolphins.

Early life and education
Eifler was born on February 13, 1998, in Berkeley, California. He was adopted by research professor Rachel Morello-Frosch and David Eifler. He attended Bishop O'Dowd High School, playing running back and linebacker. He did not play as a freshman, but was convinced by Hardy Nickerson to try out football as a sophomore. He earned first-team All-WACC, third-team All-East Bay and honorable mention San Francisco Chronicle All-Metro honors as a junior. He was named first-team All-West Alameda County Conference-Foothill League at the outside linebacker position as a senior. He also received an invitation to the U.S. Army All-American Bowl. Eifler was the number 94 prospect in the nation by Scout.com, 118 by Rivals.com, 142 by 247Sports.com and 280 by ESPN.

After graduating from high school, Eifler accepted a scholarship offer from the University of Washington. He spent his freshman season of 2016 as a redshirt, and did not see any playing time. He played in all 13 games in the following year, making six total tackles. He transferred to the University of Illinois in 2018, but did not play due to transfer rules. In 2019 at Illinois, Eifler played in all 13 games and started 12 at the linebacker position. He made 69 total tackles, ten for loss, and recorded a fumble return touchdown against Minnesota. He appeared in six games, starting five, as a senior in 2020, compiling 27 tackles and one sack on the season.

Professional career
After going unselected in the 2021 NFL Draft, Eifler was signed by the New York Jets as an undrafted free agent. He was waived at roster cuts. He was signed by the Miami Dolphins to the practice squad on September 3.

Eifler signed with the Washington Football Team on December 7, 2021. He made his NFL debut in Week 14. Eifler re-signed with Washington on March 17, 2022. He was placed on injured reserve on October 8, 2022. He was activated on November 25.
 
On February 28, 2023, Eifler signed a one-year contract extension with the Commanders.

References

External links
Washington Commanders bio
Illinois Fighting Illini bio

1998 births
Living people
Players of American football from Berkeley, California
American football linebackers
Washington Huskies football players
Illinois Fighting Illini football players
New York Jets players
Miami Dolphins players
Washington Football Team players
Washington Commanders players